The 1088 Tmogvi earthquake occurred on April 16 or April 22, 1088, on Easter Sunday, in the southern provinces of the Kingdom of Georgia. It takes its name from the castle of Tmogvi, in Javakheti, whose destruction is specifically noted in the medieval annals of Georgia. Its magnitude is estimated as 6.5 on the surface wave magnitude scale.

History
The Tmogvi earthquake was one of the largest recorded earthquakes in the history of Georgia, and was associated with the active faults of the Javakheti Plateau in the Lesser Caucasus.

According to the anonymous 12th-century Life of King of Kings David, the earthquake shook Georgia on the "last day of Holy Week, on the very resurrection of our Lord Jesus Christ". The chronicle reports widespread destruction and many casualties and adds that "fearsome trembling of the earth lasted for a year". The author specifically notes the collapse of the castle of Tmogvi, trapping its lord Kakhaber, son of Niania, and his wife underneath.

See also
List of earthquakes in Georgia (country)
List of historical earthquakes

Notes

References

Tmogvi
1088 in Asia
1088 in Europe
11th century in the Kingdom of Georgia
Earthquakes in Georgia (country)